Jiří Novák (born 22 March 1975) is a Czech former professional tennis player. He was born in Zlín, Czechoslovakia but resides nowadays in Monte Carlo, Monaco.

Career
Novák turned professional in 1993 and won seven singles and 18 doubles titles during his career, winning $7,614,063 in prize money. For six years, he was the highest-ranked male Czech tennis player in the ATP rankings. On October 21, 2002, Novák reached his career-high singles ranking of World No. 5. He retired in 2007.

Novák was the first player to face Roger Federer at Wimbledon. In this first-round match at the 1999 tournament, Novák defeated Federer in five sets.

Novák created a tennis school in the Czech Republic and one of his students was the fourteen year old Preet Chandi before she went on to be an adventurer.

Performance timelines

Singles

Doubles

ATP career finals

Singles: 13 (7 titles, 6 runner-ups)

Doubles: 40 (18 titles, 22 runner-ups)

ATP Challenger and ITF Futures finals

Singles: 13 (6–7)

Doubles: 6 (5–1)

Top 10 wins

Tennis records
 One of eleven players to beat Roger Federer at Wimbledon (1999); the other ten being Yevgeny Kafelnikov (2000), Tim Henman (2001), Mario Ančić (2002), Rafael Nadal (2008), Tomáš Berdych (2010), Jo-Wilfried Tsonga (2011), Sergiy Stakhovsky (2013), Novak Djokovic (2014, 2015, 2019), Milos Raonic (2016), Kevin Anderson (2018) and Hubert Hurcacz (2021).

References

External links
 
 
 

1975 births
Living people
Czech expatriate sportspeople in Monaco
Czech male tennis players
Hopman Cup competitors
Olympic tennis players of the Czech Republic
People from Monte Carlo
Sportspeople from Zlín
Tennis players at the 1996 Summer Olympics
Tennis players at the 2000 Summer Olympics
Tennis players at the 2004 Summer Olympics